Maragatha Veenai may refer to:
 Maragatha Veenai (film), a 1986 Indian film
 Maragatha Veenai (TV series), a 2014 Indian soap opera